Platon Zhukovich (1857–1919) was an Imperial Russian historian and theologian.

Biography 
Born to a family of Russian Orthodox church official (protoiereus), in 1881 he graduated from the Saint Petersburg Theological Academy. He worked as a teacher at the Polotsk Theological School before moving to Vilna where he taught history of the Orthodox church at the local theological school.

In 1891 he returned to his alma mater as head of the historical faculty and in 1901 became an ordinary professor. In 1914 he joined the Imperial Russian Historical Society. During the Russian revolution he was an active member of the 1917–18 Local Council of the Russian Orthodox Church. He died in 1919.

1857 births
1919 deaths
People from Pruzhany
People from Pruzhansky Uyezd
Members of the Russian Orthodox Church
20th-century Russian historians
19th-century historians from the Russian Empire